Let It Bloom is the Black Lips' third LP album, released in 2005.

Track listing 

 "Sea of Blasphemy" - 1:35
 "Can't Dance" - 1:52
 "Boomerang" - 2:05
 "Hippie, Hippie, Hoorah" (Jacques Dutronc cover) - 3:31
 "Not a Problem" - 3:01
 "Gung Ho" - 1:48
 "Everybody's Doin' It" - 2:41
 "Feeling Gay" - 3:47
 "Take Me Home (Back to Boone)" - 2:26
 "Gentle Violence" - 2:11
 "She's Gone" - 1:43
 "Fairy Stories" - 1:51
 "Dirty Hands" - 2:05
 "Workin'" - 2:11
 "Punk Slime" - 4:21
 "Empassant" - 2:53

2005 albums
Black Lips albums